Fungal Biology is a scientific journal that publishes peer-reviewed papers on all aspects of basic and applied research of the fungi, including lichens, yeasts, oomycetes, and slime moulds. A publication of the British Mycological Society, it was founded in 1896 as Transactions of the British Mycological Society (1896–1989) and was later titled Mycological Research (1989–2010). The founding editor was Carleton Rea (1896–1930).

History 
The journal was established in 1896 under the title Transactions of the British Mycological Society. The founding editor was Carleton Rea, who continued in the role until 1930. Rea was the sole editor until 1919, when he was joined by John Ramsbottom; subsequently there were two or three editors until 1967 when the group was expanded under a Senior Editor. The earliest issues contained reports on fungus-collecting expeditions and the first British sightings of fungal species; later, research papers and reviews were also published. The journal was initially printed by Ebenezer Baylis & Son in Worcester; in 1919, the publisher changed to Cambridge University Press.

The editors until 1967 were: 
Carleton Rea (1896–1930)
John Ramsbottom (1919–1942)
H. Wormald (1931–1945)
B. Barnes (1931–1949)
W. C. Moore (1946–1952)
P. H. Gregory (1950–1955)
G. C. Ainsworth (1953–1958)
S. D. Garrett (1956–1961)
G. M. Waterhouse (1959–1964)
J. G. Manners (1962–1967)
J. M. Waterston (1965–1970).

The journal changed its name to Mycological Research in 1989. Brian C. Sutton, one of the editors of Transactions since 1970, became the first Senior Editor of Mycological Research, remaining in the position until at least 1997. Its frequency was quarterly, increasing to monthly by 1997, when it was still being published by Cambridge University Press. It obtained its current title in 2010.

References

External links 
 
 Online access to Transactions of the British Mycological Society
 Online access to Mycological Research

Mycology journals
English-language journals
Monthly journals
Elsevier academic journals
Publications established in 1896
British Mycological Society
1896 establishments in the United Kingdom